Angel Penchev is a Bulgarian psycho-neurologist and morphologist, director of the mental-psychiatric clinic at the Sofia Faculty of Medicine. He fled Bulgaria after the Soviet Union invaded in 1944.

References

Bulgarian scientists
Year of birth missing
Possibly living people